Urophora impicta is a species of tephritid or fruit flies in the genus Urophora of the family Tephritidae.

Distribution
Russia, Turkmenistan, Afghanistan.

References

Urophora
Insects described in 1914
Diptera of Asia